"Kimnotyze" is the lead single of Lil' Kim for record producer DJ Tomekk's second album Beat of Life Vol. 1. It was released in Switzerland, Austria and Germany only. The song was successful, becoming Lil' Kim's third consecutive Top 10 hit in Germany after her number 1 hit "Lady Marmalade" featuring Christina Aguilera, Mýa, Pink and Missy Elliott and her number 3 hit "In the Air Tonite" featuring Phil Collins. She is the only rapper to achieve this in Germany.

The song is mostly in English but also contains German lyrics, notably a rap by Trooper Da Don and Kim's recurring "Gib's mir richtig, ganz egal wo" (Give it to me right, no matter where). The song samples its instrumental beat from Mtume's "Juicy Fruit" and its chorus is a re-interpretation of the hit song "Hypnotize" by Notorious B.I.G. The song also features the title melody of the German version of Sesame Street transposed to minor scale.

Track listing
Kimnotyze (Radio/TV Version) – 3:00 
Kimnotyze (Lil Kim Mix) – 3:03 
Kimnotyze (Club Mix) – 3:30 
Kimnotyze (Instrumental) – 3:21 
Colorado Part. 1 (feat. Fatman Scoop) – 4:33

Charts

Weekly charts

Year-end charts

References

External links

2001 songs
2002 singles
Lil' Kim songs
Sony BMG singles
Songs written by Lil' Kim